Ugo Blanchet (born 5 January 1999) is a French tennis player.

Blanchet has a career high ATP singles ranking of 313 achieved on 11 September 2022. He also has a career high ATP doubles ranking of 452 achieved on 9 May 2022.

Blanchet made his ATP main draw debut at the 2022 Open 13 after receiving a wildcard into the doubles main draw with Timo Legout.

Challenger and ITF World Tennis Tour Finals

Singles: 8 (5-3)

References

External links
 
 
 

1999 births
Living people
French male tennis players
People from Saint-Julien-en-Genevois
Sportspeople from Haute-Savoie